The 1986–87 season was Chelsea Football Club's seventy-third competitive season.

Table

References

External links
 1986–87 season at stamford-bridge.com

1986–87
English football clubs 1986–87 season